Barbaresco may refer to:
 Barbaresco, an Italian wine made with the Nebbiolo grape
 Barbaresco, Piedmont, a municipality in the Province of Cuneo in the Italian region Piedmont
 Enzo Barbaresco, a former football referee from Italy